This is a list of organizations that use the bulldog as a mascot.

Because of its tenacity, the bulldog is a symbol of the United Kingdom and is a popular mascot for professional sports teams, universities, secondary schools, military institutions, and other organizations, including the following:

Sports teams 
This section includes professional and semi-professional teams, as well as amateur teams not affiliated with an educational institution. School teams are listed in the sections for Universities and Secondary schools below.

Australia
 Canterbury-Bankstown Bulldogs (NRL)
 Capalaba Bulldogs (BPL)
 Central District Football Club (SANFL)
 South Fremantle Football Club (WAFL)
 Western Bulldogs (AFL)
Canada
 Alberni Valley Bulldogs, British Columbia Hockey League
 Antigonish Bulldogs, Maritime Junior A Hockey League
 Halton Hills Bulldogs, OLA Junior B Lacrosse League
 Hamilton Bulldogs, American Hockey League 1996–2015
 Hamilton Bulldogs, Ontario Hockey League
 Kincardine Bulldogs, Western Junior C Hockey League
 Quebec Bulldogs, one-time professional ice hockey team
 Tri-City Bulldogs, Canadian Junior Football League 1994–2004
 
United Kingdom
 Barnsley F.C., Football League Championship (mascot name: Toby Tyke)
 Batley Bulldogs, Rugby League Championships
 Birmingham City F.C., Football League Championship (mascot name: Beau Brummie)
 Great Britain national Australian rules football team
United States
 Boston Bulldogs, American Football League 1926
 Boston Bulldogs, National Football League 1929
 Boston Bulldogs, A-League and USL Pro Soccer League 1999–2001
 Canton Bulldogs, Ohio League and National Football League 1905–1926
 Cleveland Bulldogs, National Football League 1924–1927
 Dayton Bulldogs, National Indoor Football League
 Denver Bulldogs, United States Australian Football League
 Flint Bulldogs, Colonial Hockey League 1991–93
 Los Angeles Bulldogs, 2nd American Football League and Pacific Coast Professional Football League 1936–1948
 New York Bulldogs, National Football League 1949–1950
Other countries
 Odense Bulldogs, Oddset Ligaen (ice hockey) (Denmark)
 CS Dinamo București, SuperLiga (rugby union) (Romania)
 Border Bulldogs (rugby union) (South Africa)

Universities

United States

 Adrian College (mascot name: Bruiser)
 Alabama A&M University
 Allan Hancock College (mascot name: Spike)
 Ave Maria University
 Bellevue College
 Barton College (mascot name: Bully)
 Bowie State University (mascot name: Butch)
 Brooklyn College      (mascot name: Buster)
 Bryant University (mascot name: Tupper II)
 Butler University (mascot name: Butler Blue IV; costumed mascot: Hink)
 California State University, Fresno (Fresno State) (mascot: Timeout; live mascot: Victor E. Bulldog)
 The Citadel (mascot names: General and Boo V)
 College of San Mateo
 Concordia University, Nebraska
 Dean College (Mascot name: Boomer)
 DeSales University
 Drake University (mascot name: Spike, live mascot: Griff)
 Ferris State University (mascot name: Brutus)
 Fresno State University (mascot name: Victor E. Bulldog)
 Gardner–Webb University (team name: the Runnin' Bulldogs, mascot name: Mac the Bulldog)
 Georgetown University (team name: the Hoyas, mascot name: Jack the Bulldog)
 University of Georgia (mascot name: Uga, costumed mascot: Hairy Dawg)
 Gonzaga University (mascot name: Spike Q. Gonzaga)
 James Madison University (mascot name: Duke Dog)
 Kettering University (mascot name: General Determination)
 Louisiana Tech University (mascot names: Tech XX and Champ)
 McPherson College (mascot name: Ben the Bulldog)
 University of Minnesota Duluth (mascot name: Champ)
 University of Montana Western (mascot name: Charge)
 Mississippi State University (mascot name: Bully the Bulldog)
 North Carolina A&T State University (team name: the Aggies)
 Union University (mascot name: Buster)
 University of North Carolina at Asheville (mascot name: Rocky)
 University of Puerto Rico at Mayagüez (mascot name: Tarzán)
 University of Redlands (mascot name: Addie/Adelaide)
 Samford University (mascot name: Sam)
 South Carolina State University
 South Suburban College
 Southwestern Oklahoma State University (mascot names: Duke and Brandi)
 Texas Lutheran University  (mascot name: Lucky)
 Truman State University (mascot names: Spike and Simone)
 Western Illinois University (team name: the Leathernecks, mascot name: Colonel Rock)
 Wilberforce University
 Wingate University (mascot name: Victor E. Bulldog)
 Yale University (mascot name: Handsome Dan)

Other countries
Bath Spa University, Bath, Somerset (England)
Churchill College, Cambridge (England)
National University (the Philippines)

Secondary schools
(in the United States, unless otherwise noted)

 Albuquerque High School (Albuquerque, New Mexico)
 Alfred E. Beach High School (Savannah, Georgia)
 Alvord High School (Alvord, Texas)
 Amherst High School (Amherst, Texas)
 Andalusia High School (Andalusia, Alabama)
 Anderson County High School (Garnett, Kansas)
 Anton High School (Anton, Texas) 
 Appalachia High School (Appalachia, Virginia)
 Auburn High School (Auburn, Nebraska)
 Austin High School (Sugar Land, Texas)
 Avery High School (Avery, Texas)
 Bancroft School (Worcester, Massachusetts)
 Bandera High School (Bandera, Texas)
 Barbara Bush Middle School (San Antonio, Texas)
 Barry Goldwater High School (Phoenix, Arizona)
 Baton Rouge Magnet High School (Baton Rouge, Louisiana)
 Batavia High School (Batavia, Illinois)
 Benjamin Bosse High School (Evansville, Indiana)
 Bearden High School (Knoxville, Tennessee)
 Beaver Lake Middle School (Issaquah, Washington)
 Bedford High School (Bedford, New Hampshire)
 Bellerose Composite High School (Saint Albert, Alberta) (Canada)
 Belmont Secondary School   ( Victoria, Brirish Columbia) (Canada)
 Berea High School (Greenville, South Carolina)
 Berwick Academy (South Berwick, Maine)
 Berwick Area Senior High School (Berwick, Pennsylvania)
 Bettendorf High School (Bettendorf, Iowa)
 Big Spring High School (Newville, Pennsylvania)
 Boiling Springs High School  (Boiling Springs, South Carolina)
 Boling High School (Boling, Texas)
 Booker T. Washington High School  (Atlanta, Georgia)
 Borger High School  (Borger, Texas)
 Bosqueville High School  (Waco, Texas)
 Bowie High School (Bowie, Maryland)
 Bowie High School (Austin, Texas)
 Brandywine High School (Wilmington, Delaware)
 Bridgeport High School (Bridgeport, Ohio)
 Bridgeton High School  (Bridgeton, New Jersey)
 Brighton High School  (Brighton, Michigan)
 Brownsburg High School (Brownsburg, Indiana)
 Brunswick High School  (Lawrenceville, Virginia)
 Buena High School (Ventura, California)
 Bullis School (Potomac, Maryland) 	
 Burbank High School (Burbank, California)
 Burkburnett High School  (Burkburnett, Texas)
 Burnet High School (Burnet, Texas)
 Butler High School (Augusta, Georgia)
 Bynum High School (Bynum, Texas)
 C. D. Hylton High School (Woodbridge, Virginia) 
 Cache High School  (Cache, Oklahoma)
 Camden High School (Camden, South Carolina)
 Canton McKinley High School (Canton, Ohio)
 Carthage High School (Carthage, Texas)
 Cashmere High School  (Cashmere, Washington)
 Cecilia High School (Saint Martin Parish, Louisiana)
 Cedartown High School (Cedartown, Georgia)
 Celina High School (Celina, Ohio)
 Centennial High School (Las Vegas, Nevada)
 Centerville Senior High School (Centerville, Indiana)
 Central High School (Springfield, Missouri)
 Chamblee High School (Chamblee, Georgia)
 Chelsea High School, Chelsea, Michigan
 Churchill School (Harare, Zimbabwe)
 Clarke County High School (Grove Hill, Alabama)
 Clyde High School (Clyde, Texas)
 Columbus Grove High School (Columbus Grove, Ohio)
 Columbus North High School (Columbus, Indiana)
 Cooper High School (Cooper, Texas)
 Copperas Cove High School (Copperas Cove, Texas)
 Creswell High School (Creswell, Oregon) (mascot name: Jake)
 Crestview High School (Crestview, Florida)
 Crosby High School (Waterbury, Connecticut)
 Crown Point High School  (Crown Point, Indiana)
 David W. Butler High School (Charlotte, North Carolina)
 Dawson High School (Dawson, Texas)
 Decatur High School (Decatur, Georgia)
 Defiance High School (Defiance, Ohio)
 Douglass High School (Douglass, Kansas)
 Douglas High School (Douglas, Arizona)
 Dutchtown High School (Hampton, Georgia)
 Dwight-Englewood School (Englewood, New Jersey)
 Easton Area High School (Easton, Pennsylvania) (team name: the Red Rovers)
 East Knox High School (Howard, Ohio)
 East Palestine High School (East Palestine, Ohio)
 Eden High School (Eden, Texas)
 Edmond Memorial High School (Edmond, Oklahoma)
 Elida High School (Elida, Ohio)
 Ellensburg High School (Ellensburg, Washington)
 Eustace High School (Eustace, Texas)
 Everman Joe C. Bean High School (Everman, Texas)
 Fairfax High School (Fairfax, Missouri)
 Fayetteville High School (Fayetteville, Arkansas)
 Flagler Palm Coast High School (Bunnell, Florida)
 Folsom High School (Folsom, California)
 Fontainebleau High School (Mandeville, Louisiana)
 Forsyth Central High School (Cumming, Georgia)
 Fort Zumwalt South High School (Saint Peters, Missouri)
 Frank Scott Bunnell High School (Stratford, Connecticut)
 Freedom High School (Freedom, Pennsylvania)
 Fulton High School (Fulton, Kentucky)
 G. Holmes Braddock High School (Miami, Florida)
 Galena High School (Galena, Kansas)
 George Wythe High School (Richmond, Virginia)
 Garfield High School (East Los Angeles, California)
 Garfield High School (Seattle, Washington)
 Garfield Heights High School (Garfield Heights, Ohio)
 Garrison High School  (Garrison, Texas)
 George W. Hewlett High School (Hewlett, New York)
 Grandville High School (Grandville, Michigan)
 Green High School (Green, Ohio)
 Greenwood High School (Greenwood, Arkansas)
 Haddonfield Memorial High School (Haddonfield, New Jersey)
 Hamburg High School (Hamburg, New York)
 Hamilton High School (Hamilton, Texas)
 Hampton High School (Hampton, Tennessee)
 Hancock Central High School (Hancock, Michigan)
 Harlem High School (Harlem, Georgia)
 Hazard High School (Hazard, Kentucky)
 Heights High School (Houston Heights, Texas)
 Hemet High School  (Hemet, California)
 Hermiston High School  (Hermiston, Oregon)
 Holly Grove Middle School (Holly Springs, North Carolina)
 Hopewell Valley Central High School (Pennington, New Jersey)
 Iola High School (Iola, Texas)
 Ira High School (Ira, Texas)
 Irvington High School (Irvington, New York)
 Island Trees High School (Levittown, New York)
 Jay M. Robinson High School (Concord, North Carolina)
 Jefferson High School (Jefferson, Texas)
 John B. Alexander High School (Laredo, Texas)
 Judge Memorial Catholic High School (Salt Lake City, Utah)
 Kenmore East High School, (Tonawanda, New York)
 Kilgore High School (Kilgore, Texas)
 Kingman High School (Kingman, Arizona)
 La Porte High School (La Porte, Texas)
 Lanier County High School (Lakeland, Georgia)
 Las Cruces High School (Las Cruces, New Mexico)
 Lawrence County High School (Louisa, Kentucky)
 Le Jardin Academy (Honolulu, Hawaii)
 Lindenhurst Senior High School (Lindenhurst, New York)
 Lithonia High School (Lithonia, Georgia)
 Long Island City High School (Queens, New York, New York)
 Louisville Male High School (Louisville, Kentucky)
 Luella High School (Locust Grove, Georgia)
 Luray High School (Luray, Virginia)
 Lyman Memorial High School (Lebanon, Connecticut)
 Lynn English High School (Lynn, Massachusetts)
 Macon County High School (Montezuma, Georgia)
 Madison High School (Madison, Kansas)
 Magnolia High School (Magnolia, Texas)
 Mahomet-Seymour High School (Mahomet, Illinois)
 Marion High School (Marion, Texas)
 Marlin High School (Marlin, Texas)
 Martinsburg High School (Martinsburg, West Virginia)
 Martinsville High School (Martinsville, Virginia)
 Mary Persons High School (Forsyth, Georgia)
 McAllen High School (McAllen, Texas)
 McCluer South-Berkeley High School (St. Louis, Missouri)
 McGregor High School (McGregor, Texas)
 McLoughlin Middle School (Medford, Oregon)
 Meadville Area Senior High School (Meadville, Pennsylvania)
 Melbourne High School (Melbourne, Florida)
 Memorial Middle School (Tampa, Florida)
 Milbank High School (Milbank, South Dakota)
 Milford High School (Milford, Texas)
 Millsap High School (Millsap, Texas)
 Montachusett Regional Vocational Technical School (Fitchburg, Massachusetts)
 Montclair High School (Montclair, New Jersey)
 Mount Vernon High School (Mount Vernon, Washington)
 Mount Zion High School (Jonesboro, Georgia)
 Natchez High School (Natchez, Mississippi)
 Nederland High School (Nederland, Texas)
 New Albany High School (New Albany, Indiana)
 New Haven High School (New Haven, Indiana)
 New London High School (New London, Wisconsin)
 Newberry High School (Newberry, South Carolina)
 Noble and Greenough School (Dedham, Massachusetts)
 Norfolk Academy (Norfolk, Virginia)
 North Bend High School (North Bend, Oregon)
 North Caroline High School (Denton, Maryland)
 North Gwinnett High School (Suwanee, Georgia)
 North Platte High School (North Platte, Nebraska)
 North Shore Technical High School (Middleton, Massachusetts)
 Northern Lehigh High School (Slatington, Pennsylvania)
 Notre Dame High School (Cape Girardeau, Missouri)
 Oak Hills High School (Oak Hills, California)
 Old Rochester Regional High School (Mattapoisett, Massachusetts)
 Olmsted Falls High School (Olmsted Falls, Ohio)
 Omaha Burke High School (Omaha, Nebraska)
 Otsego High School (Otsego, Michigan)
 Ottoson Middle School (Arlington, Massachusetts)
 Ottumwa High School (Ottumwa, Iowa)
 Palisade High School (Palisade, Colorado)
 Pasadena High School (Pasadena, California)
 Pasco High School (Pasco, Washington)
 Passaic County Technical Institute (Wayne, New Jersey)
 Paul Laurence Dunbar High School (Lexington, Kentucky)
 Plainview High School (Plainview, Texas)
 Portland High School (Portland, Maine)
 Queen City High School (Queen City, Texas)
 Queen Creek High School (Queen Creek, Arizona)
 Quitman High School (Quitman, Texas)
 Ranger High School (Ranger, Texas)
 Raoul Wallenberg Traditional High School (San Francisco, California)
 Ravenna High School (Ravenna, Michigan)
 Red River Senior High School (Coushatta, Louisiana)
 Rice High School (Rice, Texas)
 Ririe High School (Ririe, Idaho)
 Riverside Brookfield High School (Riverside, Illinois)
 Rockdale County High School (Conyers, Georgia)
 Rockland Senior High School (Rockland, Massachusetts)
 Roger Ludlowe Middle School (Fairfield, Connecticut)
 Rolla High School (Rolla, Missouri)
 Roslyn High School (Roslyn Heights, New York)
 Rossford High School (Rossford, Ohio)
 Rossville High School (Rossville, Kansas)
 Royse City High School (Royse City, Texas)
 Ruben S. Ayala High School (Chino Hills, California)
 Rumson-Fair Haven Regional High School (Rumson, New Jersey)
 Rutherford High School (Rutherford, New Jersey)
 Safford High School (Safford, Arizona)
 San Jose High School (San Jose, California)
 San Rafael High School (San Rafael, California)
 St. Albans School (Washington, D.C.)
 St. Clair High School (Saint Clair, Missouri)
 Saint Cloud High School (Saint Cloud, Florida)
 Saint James High School for Boys (Chester, Pennsylvania – closed in 1993)
 School of the Future (New York City) (New York, New York)
 Shady Side Academy (Pittsburgh, Pennsylvania)
 Sheffield High School (Sheffield, Alabama)
 Sikeston High School (Sikeston, Missouri)
 Sir Winston Churchill High School (Calgary, Alberta, Canada)
 Sir Winston Churchill Secondary School (Hamilton, Ontario, Canada)
 Somerset High School (Somerset, Texas)
 South Fork High School (Stuart, Florida)
 South Harrison High School (Bethany, Missouri)
 Southeast Raleigh Magnet High School (Raleigh, North Carolina)
 Southern High School (Anne Arundel County, Maryland)
 Spur High School (Spur, Texas)
 Stamford High School (Stamford, Texas)
 Stone Bridge High School (Ashburn, Virginia)
 Stow-Munroe Falls High School (Stow, Ohio)
 Sulphur High School (Sulphur, Oklahoma)
 Summerfield High School (Petersburg, Michigan)
 Sutherlin High School (Sutherlin, Oregon)
 Suwannee High School (Live Oak, Florida)
 Sweeny High School (Sweeny, Texas)
 Taft Middle School (Crown Point, Indiana)
 Taylor County High School (Perry, Florida)
 Tazewell High School (Tazewell, Virginia)
 Terry High School (Terry, Mississippi)
 Thomasville High School (Thomasville, Georgia)
 Thomson High School (Thomson, Georgia)
 Three Rivers High School (Three Rivers, Texas)
 Thorndale High School (Thorndale, Texas)
 Toombs County High School (Lyons, Georgia)
 Tracy High School (Tracy, California)
 Trenton High School (Trenton, Missouri)
 Tri-Cities High School (East Point, Georgia)
 Trimble Tech High School (Fort Worth, Texas)
 Trion High School (Trion, Georgia)
 Turlock High School (Turlock, California)
 Tygarts Valley High School (Mill Creek, West Virginia)
 Vacaville High School (Vacaville, California)
 Valley Forge Military Academy and College (Wayne, Pennsylvania)
 Vancleave High School (Vancleave, Mississippi)
 Waialua High and Intermediate School (Waialua, Hawaii)
 Waller High School (Waller, Texas)
 Walter M. Williams High School (Burlington, North Carolina)
 Waterloo High School (Waterloo, Illinois)
 Waukegan High School (Waukegan, Illinois)
 West Albany High School (Albany, Oregon)
 West Allis Central High School (West Allis, Wisconsin)
 West Covina High School  (West Covina, California)
 Westerly High School (Westerly, Rhode Island)
 Westfield High School (Chantilly, Virginia)
 Wilson High School (Spring Township, Berks County, Pennsylvania)
 Winder-Barrow High School (Winder, Georgia)
 Winslow High School (Winslow, Arizona)
 Woodburn High School (Woodburn, Oregon)
 Wylie High School (Abilene, Texas) (mascot name: Spike)
 Yale High School (Yale, Michigan)

Other uses

Military
 
 United States Air Force Academy, Cadet Squadron 13, "the Bulldawgs"
 United States Air Force, 354th Fighter Squadron
 United States Air Force Basic Military Training, 326th Training Squadron
 United States Army, 3rd Infantry Division
 United States Marine Corps
 VMA-223

Commercial organizations 
 Bulldog Films, a brand name and mascot used by film pioneer Will Barker
 Churchill Insurance
 Mack Trucks
 Omega Psi Phi fraternity
 Victory Records

Musical artists
 The Mighty Mighty Bosstones

Public service
 New York City Fire Department, Rescue 2 (Brooklyn)

Wrestling
 British Bulldogs, a WWF wrestling team accompanied to the ring by Matilda and later Winston, a Bulldog

Miscellaneous
 Mongrel Mob, a New Zealand gang

Fictional 
 Syracuse Bulldogs, an ice-hockey team in the 1977 film Slap Shot

Bulldog
Bulldog